Maria Harfanti (born 20 January 1992) is an Indonesian TV Host, social activist, pianist and beauty pageant titleholder who was crowned as Miss Indonesia 2015. She represented her country in Miss World 2015 pageant and was placed as 2nd Runner Up and Miss World Asia 2015.

Filmography
2016 - Selamat Malam Indonesia, AnTV as a Host
2017 - Miss Indonesia 2017 as a Judge
2017 - Big Circle, Metro TV as a Co-Host
2018 - Miss Indonesia 2018 as a Judge
2018 - Forum Duta Besar, TVRI as a Host
2019 - Miss Indonesia 2019 as a Judge
2020 - Miss Indonesia 2020 as a Judge

Miss Indonesia's CROWN
Maria Harfanti is successor incumbent at 16 February 2015 until 24 February 2016 (only 1 year hold the crown) and her crown is given to Miss Indonesia 2016.

Personal life
Harfanti graduated with a master's degree at University of Indonesia majoring Master of Management.

During her bachelor studies at Trisakti University, she was active in several organizations such as AIESEC and Himpunan Mahasiswa. She also worked as a teaching assistant for regular and international class. In 2012, she was sent to teach children in Mainland China as a part of Global Community Development Program. Beside her passion for social works, she was also one of the best students in university, noted as the first student who graduated in her batch. Her achievements in academics have led her to becoming an Indonesian delegate for International Conference of Business Economics and Accounting in Bangkok, Thailand in 2013.

Her family has passion for music. She loves singing and playing piano. She has been a choir pianist since she was 16 years old.

After Miss Indonesia pageant, she decided to dedicate herself in social world. She has worked with 2 international NGO (Smile Train in Kenya and Rise Against Hunger in South Africa). In January 2018, she built her own social foundation named Bangun Sekolah to focus on improving education qualities in remote areas. She and her team have worked on several schools in Banten and West Java, Indonesia.

Beauty Pageant

Miss Indonesia 2015
Harfanti represented Yogyakarta and became the first lady who was crowned Miss Indonesia title on February 16, 2015, at Hall D2 Jakarta International Expo, Jakarta. Additionally she was awarded with Beauty with A Purpose award and left 33 contestants from other Indonesian provinces.

Miss World 2015
Harfanti  represented Indonesia at the 65th Miss World 2015 pageant. The venue was held in Sanya, China. She was crowned as 2nd runner-up of Miss World and was awarded Miss World Continental Queen of Beauty Asia 2015 because she has earned the highest points among Asian contestants, reaching the highest place for Indonesia in this pageant so far. She was also awarded as the winner of Beauty with A Purpose challenge event, with her project, bringing clean water source closer to people suffered from water crisis, building community toilets, and giving education about the importance of sanitation in Kamancing Village, Pandeglang, Banten. Other achievements Harfanti achieved during this pageant are becoming Top 7 in Interview, Top 10 in World Fashion Designer Award, Top 13 in Talent, Top 15 in Multimedia, and Top 25 People's Choice.

References

External links
Miss Indonesia Official website

1991 births
Living people
Miss World 2015 delegates
Indonesian Christians
Indonesian beauty pageant winners
People from Jakarta
Trisakti University alumni